The Final Tour was a concert tour by heavy metal band Mötley Crüe. At the time, it had been announced as the band's final tour before their initial hiatus from 2016 until their announced comeback reunion in 2019. Alice Cooper was announced as the opening act for the tour. The first leg of the tour began on July 2, 2014 in Grand Rapids, Michigan and concluded on November 22, 2014 in Spokane, Washington. The band further announced more dates for the second and final leg of the tour, which started February 11, 2015 in Kobe, Japan, and ended with three concerts at Staples Center in the band's hometown of Los Angeles on December 28, 30 and 31, 2015. The Tour was kicked off by a drum solo by Producer Joe of the FreeBeer & Hotwings show.

Background and development 
On January 28, 2014, Mötley Crüe held a press conference at Beacher's Madhouse Theater in Hollywood, where they announced a final tour with Alice Cooper as the opening act, and later on added New York City-based band The Raskins as a second opening act for the first leg of the tour. The band became the first to sign a binding legal document known as a "cessation of touring" contract, preventing them from touring beyond the year 2015 under the name Mötley Crüe. The first leg of the Final Tour began on July 2, 2014 in Grand Rapids, Michigan and ended on November 22, 2014 in Spokane, Washington.

In January 2015, the band announced that the Final Tour would keep going through the year of 2015, beginning with a handful of international dates in Japan, Australia, Europe and Rock in Rio for their only date in South America on the tour, followed by 34 more dates in North America to end the year and the tour. Even more North American dates however were later added in April 2015. Then a couple months later in June while in London preparing to perform at three different festivals across Europe, Mötley Crüe and Alice Cooper announced a full set of European dates, with the shows set to take place in November 2015. On July 16, 2015, the band set out on their second North American leg of the Final Tour, beginning with two sold-out nights in Anchorage, Alaska, with the first of the two shows being recorded for an upcoming live album to be released sometime after the tour concludes. They brought along New York City-based band The Cringe as a second opening act for most of the second North American leg of the tour. Drummer Tommy Lee was forced to miss a handful of shows during October 2015 due to a flare up of tendinitis in his wrist. Alice Cooper's drummer Glen Sobel filled in for Lee on drums until he was able to return. Lee was however able to perform the piano parts in the band's hit song "Home, Sweet, Home" during the encore at each of the shows he missed.

The band's final shows were held in different cities throughout the southwest region of the U.S. where the band often played as they were starting out in the early 1980s, leading up to the finales, including a performance in Las Vegas where lead vocalist Vince Neil has most recently been residing, and eventually ended with three nights at the Staples Center in the band's hometown of Los Angeles on December 28, 30 and 31st of 2015. Rumors of an intimate encore performance taking place at the Whisky a Go Go immediately following the band's New Year's Eve performance at Staples Center was dismissed by Mötley Crüe bassist Nikki Sixx in an April 2015 interview.

Set list 
The set list was shortened by two songs from the first to the second leg of the tour, no longer playing songs "On With the Show" and "Too Fast for Love". "Too Young to Fall in Love" was also dropped after the fourth concert on the tour's second leg. However "Louder Than Hell" was then added. The opening song was changed from "Saints of Los Angeles" to "Girls, Girls, Girls".

The following set list was taken from the performance on August 5, 2015 in Saint Paul, Minnesota at Xcel Energy Center:

"Girls, Girls, Girls"
"Wild Side"
"Primal Scream"
"Same Ol' Situation (S.O.S.)"
"Don't Go Away Mad (Just Go Away)"
"Smokin' in the Boys Room"
"Looks That Kill"
"Mutherfucker of the Year"
"Anarchy in the U.K."
"Shout at the Devil"
"Louder Than Hell"
Tommy Lee drum solo
Mick Mars guitar solo
"Saints of Los Angeles"
"Live Wire"
"Dr. Feelgood"
"Kickstart My Heart"
Encore
"Home Sweet Home"

Shows

Gross
Total Gross: $86.1 million
Total Attendance: 1,358,423
Shows: 158

Notes

References

2014 concert tours
2015 concert tours
Mötley Crüe concert tours
Farewell concert tours
Concert tours of North America
Concert tours of Asia
Concert tours of Oceania
Concert tours of Europe
Concert tours of South America
Concert tours of the United States
Concert tours of Canada
Concert tours of Japan
Concert tours of New Zealand
Concert tours of Australia
Concert tours of Sweden
Concert tours of Austria
Concert tours of the United Kingdom
Concert tours of Mexico
Concert tours of Germany
Concert tours of Switzerland
Concert tours of Italy
Concert tours of Finland
Concert tours of the United Arab Emirates